Lamentabili sane exitu ("with truly lamentable results") is a 1907 syllabus, prepared by the Roman Inquisition and confirmed by Pope Pius X, which condemns errors in the exegesis of Holy Scripture and in the history and interpretation of dogma. The syllabus itself does not use the term 'modernist', but was regarded as part of the Pope's campaign against modernism within the Church. The document (items 46 and 47) specifically affirmed that the Sacrament of Reconciliation was instituted by Jesus himself, as in the Gospel of John .

Published in July 1907, Lamentabili was soon to be complemented by the more comprehensive encyclical Pascendi Dominici gregis, which came out in September 1907 and had been prepared in a small circle around the Pope, whereas the 1910 antimodernist oath Sacrorum Antistitum was again compiled by the Holy Office. Most of the condemned statements in Lamentabili were taken from the writings of Alfred Loisy and his school. Other Modernists like George Tyrrell were targeted only indirectly.

See also
 Fundamentalist–Modernist controversy
 Syllabus of Errors

References

Further reading 
 Arnold, Claus/Losito, Giacomo, "Lamentabili sane exitu" (1907). Les documents préparatoires du Saint Office. (Fontes Archivi Sancti Officii Romani 6). Vatican City: Libreria Editrice Vaticana, 2011.

External links 
 Text of Lamentabili sane exitu

1907 documents
1907 in Christianity
Biblical exegesis
Heresy in the Catholic Church
Modernism in the Catholic Church